Bruford Levin Upper Extremities (B.L.U.E.) was a musical group consisting of drummer Bill Bruford, bassist Tony Levin, guitarist David Torn, and trumpeter Chris Botti.

The group's origins can be traced to Torn's ECM Records album Cloud About Mercury (1987), which featured Levin and Bruford (along with Mark Isham playing trumpet). Enjoying the chemistry in their work together, the musicians kept in touch with one another, and formed B.L.U.E. in the late 1990s under Bruford and Levin’s joint leadership. Chris Botti took the trumpeter’s role instead of Isham, who was touring with his own band at the time.

The band blended an unusual combination of elements including jazz, blues, rock and ambient music to create a unique sound. Bruford and Levin had both been longtime members of King Crimson.

Discography

 Bruford Levin Upper Extremities (1998)
 B.L.U.E. Nights (Live) (2000)

References

English rock music groups
American rock music groups
Musical groups established in 1998
Musical groups disestablished in 2000
Discipline Global Mobile artists